The soils of the Tanqwa Abergele woreda (district) in Tigray (Ethiopia) reflect its longstanding agricultural history, highly seasonal rainfall regime, relatively high temperatures, overall dominance of Precambrian metamorphic rocks and steep slopes.

Factors contributing to soil diversity

Climate 
Annual rainfall depth is very variable with an average of around 600–800 mm. Most rains fall during the main rainy season, which typically extends from June to September. 
Mean temperature in woreda town Yechila is 25.4 °C, oscillating between average daily minimum of 14.6 °C and maximum of 35.6 °C. The contrasts between day and night air temperatures are much larger than seasonal contrasts.

Geology 

From the higher to the lower locations, the following geological formations are present:
 Adigrat Sandstone
 Edaga Arbi Glacials
 Precambrian metamorphic rocks
 Quaternary alluvium and freshwater tufa

Topography 
As part of the Ethiopian highlands the land has undergone a rapid tectonic uplift, leading the occurrence of mountain peaks, plateaus, valleys and gorges.

Land use 

Generally speaking the level lands and intermediate slopes are occupied by cropland, while there is rangeland and shrubs on the steeper slopes. Remnant forests occur around Orthodox Christian churches and a few inaccessible places. A recent trend is the widespread planting of eucalyptus trees.

Environmental changes 
Soil degradation in this district became important when humans started deforestation almost 5000 years ago. Depending on land use history, locations have been exposed in varying degrees to such land degradation.

Geomorphic regions and soil units 
Given the complex geology and topography of the district, it has been organised into land systems - areas with specific and unique geomorphic and geological characteristics, characterised by a particular soil distribution along the soil catena. Soil types are classified in line with World Reference Base for Soil Resources and reference made to main characteristics that can be observed in the field.

Adigrat Sandstone cliff and footslope 

 Associated soil types
 complex of rock outcrops, very stony and very shallow soils ((Lithic) Leptosol) (1)
 shallow, stony sandy [[loam soils (Eutric Regosol and Cambisol) (21)
 Inclusions
 shallow, dry soils with very high amounts of stones (Leptic and Skeletic Cambisol and Regosol) (4)
 deep, dark cracking clays with good fertility, but problems of waterlogging (Chromic and Pellic Vertisol) (12)
 soils with stagnating water due to an abrupt textural change such as sand over clay (Haplic Planosol]]) (34)

Alluvial plain of Giba River in Abergele 

 Associated soil types
deep dark cracking clays with very good natural fertility, waterlogged during the wet season (Chromic Vertisol, Pellic Vertisol) (12)
 brown loamy sands developed on alluvium along Giba River (Fluvisol) (30)
 Inclusion: stony, dark cracking clays with good natural fertility (Vertic Cambisol) (10)

Gallery: soils in Tanqwa Abergele

Catena on metamorphic limestone in Abergele 
 

 Associated soil types
 moderately deep, stony, dark cracking clays on calcaric material  (Calcaric Vertic Cambisol) (17)
 shallow, stony, dark clay loamy soils (Epileptic Protovertic Cambisol) (18)
 imperfectly to poorly drained, shallow to very shallow, dark soils developed on calcaric material with a moderate natural fertility (Vertic Endoleptic Calcisol) (27)
 Inclusions
 shallow, stony, dark, loamy soils on calcaric material (Rendzic Leptosol) (3)
 shallow, very stony, silt loamy to loamy soils (Skeletic Cambisol, Leptic Cambisol, Skeletic Regosol) (4)
 deep dark cracking clays with very good natural fertility, waterlogged during the wet season (Chromic Vertisol, Pellic Vertisol) (12)
 Brown to dark, silty clay loams to loamy sands developed on alluvium, with good natural fertility (Fluvisol) (30)

Catena on metamorphic sedimentary rock in Abergele 
 
 Associated soil types
 Rock outcrops and very shallow soils on limestone (Calcaric Leptosol) (2) 
 Shallow stony dark loams on calcaric material (Calcaric Regosol, Calcaric Cambisol) (22)
 Inclusions
 Brown to dark, silty clay loams to loamy sands developed on alluvium, with good natural fertility (Fluvisol) (30)

Severely incised granite near Giba mouth 

 Dominant soil type: rock outcrops and very shallow soils (Lithic Leptosol) (1)
 Associated soil type: shallow, very stony, silt loamy to loamy soils (Skeletic Cambisol, Leptic Cambisol, Skeletic Regosol) (4)

Severely incised metamorphic sedimentary rock 

 Dominant soil type: rock outcrops and very shallow soils (Lithic Leptosol) (1)
 Associated soil type: shallow, stony loam soils (Eutric Regosol and Cambisol) (21)
 Inclusion: clays of floodplains with very high watertable with moderate to good natural fertility (Eutric Gleysol, Gleyic Cambisol) (33)

Metamorphic volcanic rock in Abergele 

 Dominant soil type: rock outcrops and very shallow soils (Lithic Leptosol) (1)
 Associated soil types
 shallow, very stony, silt loamy to loamy soils (Skeletic Cambisol, Leptic Cambisol, Skeletic Regosol) (4)
 shallow, stony loam soils (Eutric Regosol and Cambisol) (21) 
 Inclusion: sandy clay loams to sands developed on sandy colluvium (Eutric Arenosol, Regosol, Cambisol) (24)

References 

Soil geography of Tigray (Ethiopia)